Kolding (foaled 3 November 2015) is a New Zealand bred and Australian trained thoroughbred racehorse that has won three Group I races, as well as the inaugural running of the Golden Eagle in 2020.

Background

Kolding was purchased for $170,000 at the 2017 New Zealand Premier Yearling Sale. He is a half-brother to Sampson, winner of the Trentham Stakes, Awapuni Gold Cup and New Zealand St. Leger.

Racing career

Kolding was defeated in his first three races however won at his fourth attempt on the 23 January 2019 at Canterbury when ridden by Hugh Bowman.

On the 8 June 2019, Kolding contested his first stakes race in the Queensland Guineas at Eagle Farm.  Ridden by James McDonald he came from fourth-last to win by half a length.  After the race trainer Chris Waller said, "I think he's the right horse to go through to the spring – an Epsom type of horse, in my opinion."

Kolding went on to win the Epsom four months later and then at his next start won the first running of the Golden Eagle, collecting over $4,000,000 in prize-money.

Kolding's two other Group 1 victories were the 2020 George Main Stakes and the 2021 All Aged Stakes.

Pedigree

References 

Racehorses bred in New Zealand
Racehorses trained in Australia
2015 racehorse births